The Office of General Counsel provides legal and policy advice to the Secretary and other senior Departmental officials. The General Counsel also is the head of the Treasury Legal Division, a separate bureau within the Department that includes all legal counsels and staff of the Treasury Departmental Offices and Treasury bureaus (except for the Office of the Comptroller of the Currency and the Offices of the Inspectors General). The office was preceded by the offices of the Comptroller of the Treasury (1789–1817), First Comptroller of the Treasury (1817–1820), Agent of the Treasury (1820–1830), and Solicitor of the Treasury (1830–1934). Neil MacBride has served as General Counsel since February, 2022.

References

Office of the General Counsel